Abul Hasan Chowdhury is a Bangladeshi politician and the former state Minister of foreign affairs of Bangladesh. He served as the state minister for foreign affairs from 1996 to 2001 under the Awami League government.

Early life 
Abul Hasan Chowdhury was born in Dhaka in April 1951. He is the eldest son of the former president of Bangladesh Abu Sayeed Chowdhury and the grandson of former Speaker of East Pakistan Abdul Hamid Chowdhury.

After completing his primary and secondary education from Dhaka, Bangladesh he went to Oxford to study PPE.

Politics 
Abul Hasan Chowdhury joined Bangladesh Awami League in 1990. He won his first election in 1991 from his ancestral constituency, Modhupur. He was the opposition whip and international affairs secretary of Bangladesh Awami league from 1991 to 1996, while the party was in opposition. After winning his second election in 1996 he served as the state minister of foreign affairs.

Controversy 
The World Bank pulled out the $1.2 Bn funding for the Padma bridge project on the grounds that there was conspiracy to commit corruption. Abul Hasan Chowdhury, along with a few others, were accused of using connections in order to acquire the project. The Royal Canada Mounted Police filed a case in Toronto against the accused.

Dismissal of all Charges 
In 2015, the ACC investigated the case of Padma Bridge Scandal. After the World Bank continuously pushed the government to take actions against the alleged perpetrators, after 53 days' of investigation, ACC found nobody to be guilty. On the basis of ACC's report, Dhaka district judge court acquitted all the seven government officials who were alleged to have been involved in the corruption plot. Before that, the ACC exonerated Syed Abul Hossain and ex-state minister for foreign affairs Abul Hasan Chowdhury from the allegation of involvement in the corruption conspiracy.

In 2017, the Canadian court found no proof of Padma bridge conspiracy and the Ontario Superior Court acquitted all, dismissing the case.

Personal life 
Abul Hasan Chowdhury is married to Nahid Chowdhury.

References

Awami League politicians
Living people
1951 births